The 2008 Kazakhstan Hockey Cup was the seventh edition of the national ice hockey cup competition in Kazakhstan. Six teams participated and Kazakhmys Satpaev won its third cup.

Results

References

2008–09 in Kazakhstani ice hockey
Kazakhstan Hockey Cup